A clostridial vaccine is a vaccine for sheep and cattle that protects against diseases caused by toxins produced by an infection with one or more Clostridium bacteria. Clostridial vaccines are often administered to pregnant ewes a few weeks before they are due to give birth, in order to give passive immunity to their lambs. Clostridial bacteria multiply rapidly in infected sheep, and produce large amounts of toxin which can cause the sheep to die within hours.

Clostridial vaccines can contain anti-toxins to one or more endotoxins produced by the following bacteria:
 Clostridium chauvoei
 Clostridium haemolyticum
 Clostridium novyi
 Clostridium perfringens
 Clostridium septicum
 Clostridium sordellii
 Clostridium tetani

Clostridial vaccines which protect sheep against multiple clostridial diseases have been available since the 1950s.

References

Animal vaccines
Sheep and goat diseases